Jorge Grau Potrille (born 15 February 1987) is a Cuban sports shooter. He competed in the men's 10 metre air pistol event at the 2016 Summer Olympics. He competed at the 2020 Summer Olympics.

References

External links
 

1987 births
Living people
Cuban male sport shooters
Olympic shooters of Cuba
Shooters at the 2016 Summer Olympics
Shooters at the 2020 Summer Olympics
Pan American Games medalists in shooting
Pan American Games silver medalists for Cuba
Shooters at the 2015 Pan American Games
Shooters at the 2019 Pan American Games
Medalists at the 2015 Pan American Games
Medalists at the 2019 Pan American Games
Sportspeople from Guantánamo
21st-century Cuban people